Fredrik Strand Halland is a Norwegian singer, songwriter, guitarist and producer based in Los Angeles.

Early life
Born in Bergen, Halland began playing the guitar at a very young age. When he turned 9, he started taking lessons from guitarist Mads Eriksen, who first introduced Halland to the Blues. At twelve he performed a Stevie Ray Vaughan classic from Texas Flood in a Norwegian talent competition; in 2007 he was awarded the City of Bergen's talent prize; at 16 he won the Notodden Blues Festival contest for blues guitarists. He soon had over 100 live performances, including at South by Southwest in Austin, Texas.

Career
At the age of 16 Halland moved to Los Angeles after receiving a scholarship to attend the Musicians Institute in Hollywood. He was selected as the first runner-up in Guitar Player Magazine’s “Guitar Superstar 2011” competition hosted by guitarist Larry Carlton. After graduating with honors, Halland started his own production company, named after the mountains surrounding his hometown. He toured with Colbie Caillat soon after. He played guitar on Justin Bieber's "Roller Coaster" in 2013 and on Michael Jackson’s posthumous album Xscape in 2014.

References 

Norwegian musicians
Norwegian singer-songwriters
Norwegian record producers
Norwegian pop musicians
Norwegian pop singers
Norwegian songwriters
Norwegian rock musicians
English-language singers from Norway
1993 births
Living people
Norwegian expatriates in the United States
21st-century Norwegian singers
21st-century Norwegian male singers